Penicillium purpurescens is a species of fungus in the genus Penicillium which was isolated from soil in Canada. This species is similar to Penicillium glabrum. Penicillium purpurescens produces hadacidin.

References

Further reading 
 
 

purpurescens
Fungi described in 1923